Bishop's Castle was a borough constituency in Shropshire represented in the House of Commons of the Parliament of the United Kingdom.

The market town of Bishop's Castle became a parliamentary borough in 1584 and was a constituency of the House of Commons of England until 1707, of the House of Commons of Great Britain from 1707 to 1800, and of the House of Commons of the United Kingdom from 1801 to 1832. It was represented by two burgesses.

The historian Lewis Namier claimed that in the middle of the eighteenth century it was the one notoriously corrupt parliamentary borough in Shropshire. It was abolished under the Reform Act 1832.

Members of Parliament

MPs 1584–1660

MPs 1660–1832

Constituency abolished / disenfranchised (1832)

Election results

Elections in the 1830s

See also
Parliamentary constituencies in Shropshire#Historical constituencies
List of former United Kingdom Parliament constituencies
Unreformed House of Commons

References 

Parliamentary constituencies in Shropshire (historic)
Constituencies of the Parliament of the United Kingdom established in 1584
Constituencies of the Parliament of the United Kingdom disestablished in 1832